The following is a list of Roman Catholic schools, colleges and universities in the Philippines. More than 160 colleges and universities in the Philippines are affiliated with the Catholic Church. Most of the Roman Catholic religious congregations in the Philippines own and operate schools. These include:

Angelic Sisters of Saint Paul (Angelic Sisters) – Angeliche di San Paolo (ASP)
 Mother of Divine Providence School, Marikina, Metro Manila

Augustinian Missionaries of the Philippines (AMP)
 Divina Pastora College, Gapan, Nueva Ecija

Congregation of the Augustinian Recollect Sisters [AR]
 Colegio de Santa Rosa – Manila, Sto. Tomas, Intramuros, Manila
 Colegio de Santa Rosa - Makati, Estrella St. Makati
   Colegio de Santa Rosa – Cavite, Conchu, Trece Martires City, Cavite
   Colegio de Sta. Teresita, Laoang, Northern Samar
   Colegio de la Medalla Milagrosa, Jagna, Bohol
   Colegio de Sta. Rita, San Carlos City, Negros Occidental
 Saint Rita College - Manila
 St. Joseph College, San Roque, Cavite City
 San Francisco Javier College, Narra, Palawan
 Blessed Trinity College, Talibon, Bohol
 Consolatrix College, Toledo City, Cebu
 Immaculate Conception College, Balayan, Batangas
 Notre Dame of Banga, South Cotabato
 Notre Dame of Lamba, Banga, South Cotabato

Congregation of the Daughters of St. Dominic (OP)
Dominican College, Tarlac
  Daughters of St. Dominic School, Quezon City 
  Daughters of St. Dominic School, Antipolo
  Daughters of St. Dominic School, Limay Bataan

Congregation of the Dominican Sisters of St. Catherine of Siena (OP)
Siena College of Quezon City
Siena College of Taytay, Rizal
  Siena College of Hermosa, Bataan
  Siena College of San Jose, City of San Jose del Monte, Bulacan
  Siena College of Tigaon, Camarines Sur
Santa Catalina College Manila
  Santa Catalina College Binan, Laguna
  Notre Dame-Sienna School of Koronadal, South Cotabato
  Notre Dame-Siena College of General Santos City, South Cotabato
Notre Dame-Siena College of Polomolok, South Cotabato
  Notre Dame-Siena College of Tacurong, Sultan Kudarat
  Notre Dame of Tulunan, Cotabato
  Notre Dame of Lamba, Banga, South Cotabato
  Notre Dame Hospital & School of Midwifery
Holy Trinity University
  Holy Rosary School of Pardo, Cebu

Congregation of the Missionary Benedictine Sisters of Tutzing (Missionary Benedictine Sisters) (OSB)
St. Scholastica's College Manila, Metro Manila
  St. Scholastica’s College Westgrove – Silang, Cavite
  St. Scholastica’s College Tacloban, Leyte  
St. Scholastica's Academy Marikina, Metro Manila
  St. Scholastica's Academy San Fernando, Pampanga
  St. Scholastica’s Academy Tabunok – Talisay City, Cebu
  St. Scholastica's Academy Bacolod, Negros Occidental
St. Agnes' Academy Legazpi City, Albay
Holy Family Academy, Angeles City, Pampanga
  St. Peter’s College, Ormoc City, Leyte

Congregation of the Hijas de Jesus (FI) 
 Colegio de Las Hijas de Jesus, Ledesma St., Iloilo City

Congregation of the Immaculate Heart of Mary (CICM Missionaries) – Congregatio Immaculati Cordis Mariae (CICM)
Saint Louis University, Baguio City, Benguet 
Saint Louis College of San Fernando, La Union
  Saint Louis College Cebu, Mandaue City, Cebu
University of Saint Louis Tuguegarao, Tuguegarao City, Cagayan Valley]]
Saint Mary's University, Bayombong, Nueva Vizcaya
  College of Immaculate Concepcion, Cabanatuan City, Nueva Ecija
  Santo Rosario School, Pudtol, Apayao
  Saint Catherine's School, Bambang, Nueva Vizcaya
  Saint Vincent's School, Bontoc, Mountain Province
Maryhill School of Theology, Quezon City, Metro Manila
  Maryhurst Seminary, Baguio City, Benguet 
  Maryshore Seminary, Bacolod City, Negros Occidental

Congregation of the Religious Missionaries of St. Dominic (Mission Sisters) – Congregación de Religiosas Misioneras de Sto. Domingo (OP)
Dominican College, Santa Rosa City Laguna
Dominican School, Manila
Dominican School, Dagupan
Dominican School, Santa Rita, Pampanga
Dominican School, Camalig, Albay 
Dominican Academy, Unisan, Quezon Province

Congregation of the Rogationists of the Heart of Jesus (Rogationists) -Congregatio Rogationistarum a Corde Iesu (RCJ)
  Rogationist Academy, Toril, Davao
Rogationist College, Silang, Cavite
  Rogationist College, Parañaque City

Congregation of Missionaries,   – Congregatio Missionariorum Filiorum Immaculati Cordis Beatae Mariae Virginis (C.M.F.) 
 Claret School of Quezon City
 Claret College of Isabela City 
 Claret School of Lamitan City
 Claret School of Zamboanga City
 Claret School of Maluso
 Claret School of Tumahubong

Congregation of the Mission (Vincentians) – Congregatio Missionis (CM)
Adamson University, Manila
 De Paul College Jaro Iloilo City

Company of the Daughters of Charity of Saint Vincent de Paul – Societas Filiarum Caritatis a S. Vincentio de Paulo (DC)
Universidad de Santa Isabel - Naga City, Camarines Sur
Santa Isabel College Manila - Ermita, Manila
 Saint Louise de Marrilac College of Bogo, Cebu
 Saint Louise de Marrilac College of Sorsogon City
 Saint Louise de Marillac School of Bulan, Sorsogon
 Colegio de la Inmaculada Concepcion - Cebu City, Cebu
 Colegio de la Inmaculada Concepcion - Tipolo, Mandaue City
 Concordia College - Paco, Manila
 Immaculate Heart of Mary College - Quezon City, Metro Manila
 Colegio de San Jose - Iloilo City, Iloilo
 Colegio del Sagrado Corazon de Jesus - Iloilo City, Iloilo
 Sacred Heart College - Lucena City, Quezon

Daughters of Mary Help of Christians – Congregatio Filiarum Mariae Auxiliatricis (FMA) 
 Mary Help of Christians School - Brgy. Mabiga, Mabalacat, Pampanga
 Mary Help of Christians School - Brgy. Parang, Calapan, Oriental Mindoro
 Mary Help of Christians School - Brgy. Macarascas, Puerto Princesa, Palawan
 Mary Help of Christians School - Brgy. Tungha-an, Minglanilla, Cebu
 Mary Help of Christians College- Canlubang, Laguna

Daughters of Virgin Mary Immaculate (DVMI)
 Mater Ecclesiae School, Villa Olympia Subd., San Pedro, Laguna
 Mater Ecclesiae School, Victoria, Laguna
 Virgin Mary Immaculate School Alabang, Muntinlupa, Metro Manila

Augustinian Sisters of Our Lady of Consolation (OSA) 
La Consolacion University Philippines, Malolos, Bulacan
La Consolacion College – Manila, Metro Manila
La Consolacion College – Baao, Camarines Sur
La Consolacion College - Bacolod, Negros Occidental
La Consolacion College – Biñan, Laguna
La Consolacion College - Daet, Camarines Norte
La Consolacion College - Iriga, Camarines Sur
La Consolacion College – Novaliches, Metro Manila
  La Consolacion College – Bais City, Negros Oriental
  La Consolacion College – Caloocan, Metro Manila
  La Consolacion College – Isabela, Negros Occidental
  La Consolacion College – La Carlota City, Negros Occidental
  La Consolacion College – Liloan, Cebu
  La Consolacion College – Murcia, Negros Occidental
  La Consolacion College – Pasig, Metro Manila
  La Consolacion College – Tanauan, Batangas
  La Consolacion College – Trento, Agusan del Sur
  La Consolacion College – Valenzuela, Metro Manila 
  La Consolacion School – Balagtas, Bulacan
  La Consolacion School – Gardenville Tangub, Bacolod City
  Santo Tomas College – Danao City, Cebu

Dominican Sisters of the Trinity (OP)
  Holy Cross of Hagonoy, Davao del Sur
  Holy Cross of Magsaysay, Davao del Sur
  St. James Academy Malabon, Metro Manila
  St. Vincent Academy of Maragusan, Davao de Oro
  San Antonio School, Aras-asan, Cagwait, Surigao del Sur
San Pedro College, Davao City
  Assumption Academy of Monkayo, Davao de Oro
  Fr. Urios Academy, Hinatuan, Surigao del Sur

Franciscan Sisters of the Immaculate Conception of the Holy Mother of God -Sororum Franciscalium ab Immaculata Conceptione a Beata Matre Dei (SFIC)
 Saint Joseph’s School of Mactan, Cebu

Franciscan Apostolic Sisters (FAS) 
 St. Joseph College, Canlaon City, Negros Oriental
 St. Joseph College, San Jose, Baggao, Cagayan
 Saint Michael’s High School, Gandara, Samar
 La Milagrosa Academy, Calbayog City, Samar
 Lyceum of Lallo, Cagayan

Franciscan Missionaries of Mary (FMM)
 Stella Maris College Quezon City
   Stella Maris College Oroquieta City
   Stella Maris School Cebu City
   St. Josephs Academy in Sariaya, Quezon,

Missionary Sisters of the Immaculate Conception (MIC)
Immaculate Heart of Mary Academy, Mati City, Davao Oriental

Missionary Sisters of the Immaculate Heart of Mary – Immaculati Cordis Mariae (ICM)
Saint Theresa's College of Quezon City
Saint Theresa's College of Cebu
Christ the King College, San Fernando, La Union
St. Augustine School, Tagudin, Ilocos Sur

Missionary Sisters Servants of the Holy Spirit – Congregatio Missionalis Servarum Spiritus Sancti (SSpS)
College of the Holy Spirit of Manila
College of the Holy Spirit of Tarlac
School of the Holy Spirit of BF Homes Quezon City
School of the Holy Spirit of Cubao Quezon City
Holy Spirit School of Tagbilaran
  Holy Spirit Academy of Malolos
  Holy Spirit Academy of Irosin
Holy Trinity Academy in Loay, Bohol

Missionary Oblates of Mary Immaculate (Oblates) – 
 Notre Dame University (NDU), Cotabato City
 Notre Dame of Greater Manila (NDGM)
 Notre Dame of Midsayap College (NDMC), North Cotabato
 Notre Dame of Jolo College (NDJC), Sulu
 Notre Dame of Kulaman (NDK) Sultan Kudarat
 Notre Dame of Pikit, Cotabato
 Notre Dame of Dulawan, Maguindanao
 Notre Dame of Bago City Negros Occidental
 Notre Dame of Talisay, Negros Occidental Mindanao 
 Notre Dame of Makilala, North Cotabato
 Notre Dame Learning Center, Cotabato City

Missionaries of the Assumption (MA)
Assumption College of Davao

Missionaries of Our Lady of La Salette – Missionarii Dominæ Nostræ a La Salette (M.S.)
University of La Salette, Santiago City, Isabela
La Salette of San Mateo, Isabela (1949)
La Salette of Aurora, Isabela (1952)
La Salette of Roxas, Isabela (1957)
La Salette of Quezon, Isabela (1960)
La Salette of Jones, Isabela (1961)
La Salette of Cabatuan, Isabela (1967) 
La Salette of Ramon, Isabela (1967)
La Salette of Cordon, Isabela

Institute of the Brothers of the Christian Schools (LaSallian Brothers) – Fratres Scholarum Christianarum (FSC)

Also see
De La Salle University, Manila
De La Salle University – Dasmariñas, Cavite
De La Salle Araneta University, Malabon, Metro Manila
De La Salle Andres Soriano Memorial College (DLSASMC), Lutopan, Toledo City, Cebu
De La Salle Canlubang, Laguna
De La Salle–College of Saint Benilde – Taft & Antipolo
De La Salle John Bosco College
De La Salle Lipa, Lipa, Batangas
De La Salle Medical and Health Sciences Institute
De La Salle Santiago Zobel, Ayala Alabang, Muntinlupa
De La Salle Supervised Schools
La Salle University, Ozamiz
La Salle Academy
La Salle College Antipolo
La Salle Green Hills
Jaime Hilario Integrated School – La Salle
University of St. La Salle, Bacolod
St. Benilde School, Bacolod

Institute of the Brothers of the Holy Family – Institutum Fratrum a Sancta Familia (FSF)  
Gabriel Taborin Technical School Foundation, Davao City

Institute of the Brothers of the Sacred Heart (Brothers) – Fratres a Sacratissimo Corde Iesu (SC)
 Cor Jesu College, Digos, Davao del Sur

Marist Brothers of the Schools (Marist Brothers) – Fratres Maristae a Scholis (FMS)
Notre Dame of Dadiangas University (NDDU), General Santos City, South Cotabato
Notre Dame of Marbel University (NDMU), Koronadal·City, South Cotabato 
Notre Dame of Kidapawan College (NDKC) Kidapawan City, Cotabato
Notre Dame of Cotabato (NDC) Cotobato City, Maguindanao
 Notre Dame Institute
Marist School (Marikina)

Sisters of the Presentation of Mary (PM)
 Saint Peter´s College of Toril
 Holy Cross College of Calinan
 Holy Cross of Malalag
 Holy Cross of Malita
 Holy Cross of Mintal, Davao City 
 Holy Cross of Sta. Maria
 Notre Dame of Mlang, North Cotabato
 St. Michael's School of Padada, Davao del Sur
 Presentation of Mary School in Clarin, Bohol.

Sisters of St. Paul of Chartres (SPC)

 
  St. Paul Academy of Goa, Camarines Sur
  St. Paul School of Aparri, Cagayan
  St. Paul School, Barotac Nuevo, Iloilo
  St. Paul School of Buug, Zamboanga Sibugay
  St. Paul School of Medellin, Cebu
  St. Paul School of Sta.Maria, Bulacan
  St. Paul College of Balayan, Batangas
  St. Paul College of Bocaue, Bulacan
St. Paul College of Ilocos Sur
  St. Paul College, Island Park Dasmarinas, Cavite
St. Paul College of Makati
  St. Paul College of Parañaque
St. Paul College of Pasig
  St.Paul College Pasig ExtensionFr. Louis Chauvet Foundation SchoolBrgy. Palatiw, Pasig
  St. Paul College of Pasig, Davao City
  St. Paul College of San Ildefonso, Bulacan
  St. Paul College of San Rafael, Bulacan
St. Paul University Philippines, Tuguegarao
St. Paul University Dumaguete
St. Paul University Iloilo
St. Paul University Manila
St. Paul University Quezon City
  St. Paul University San Miguel, Bulacan
St. Paul University Surigao
 
  St. Anthony Parish School of Manticao, Misamis Oriental
  St. Augustine's School Iba, Zambales
  St. William's School San Marcelino, Zambales
  St. Vincent's Academy Candelaria, Zambales
  St. Gabriel Academy Caloocan
  St. Isidore Learning Center Burgos, Pangasinan
  St. Michael College of Cantilan, Surigao del Sur
  Santo Nino High School Gitagum, Misamis Oriental 
Mt. Carmel School of Polillo, Quezon
Notre Dame of Surala, South Cotabato
Our Lady of Peace School, Antipolo

Sisters of Notre Dame (SND)
  Notre Dame Academy of Guimaras
  Notre Dame Academy of Iloilo

Teresian Daughters of Mary (TDM) 
 Assumption Academy of Peñaplata, Island Garden City of Samal 
 Holy Cross College of Sasa, Davao City 
 Maryknoll High School of Asuncion, Davao del Norte
 Maryknoll High School of New Corilla Davao del Norte
 Maryknoll School of Manay, Davao Oriental
 St. Mary’s Academy of Agoo, La Union
 St. Therese Learning Center in San Enrique, Iloilo
 Three sisters serve in key positions in the Holy Cross of Davao College.

Oblates of Notre Dame (OND)
 Notre Dame of Abuyog (NDA), Leyte 
 Notre Dame of Genio Edcor Inc., Alamada, Cotabato
   Notre Dame of Dulawan, Maguindanao:
   Notre Dame of Pikit
   Notre Dame of Kabacan
   Notre Dame Center of Cathechesis, Cotabato City
   Notre Dame Academy San Fernando, Cebu

Oblates of St. Joseph (Josephines of Asti) – Congregatio Oblatorum Sancti Iosephi (O.S.J.)
Don Antonio de Zuzuarregui Sr. Memorial Academy, Antipolo
Holy Family Academy, Padre Garcia, Batangas
Joseph Marello Institute, San Juan, Batangas
Our Lady of Mercy Academy, Taysan, Batangas
St. James Academy, Ibaan, Batangas
St. Joseph College of Rosario, Rosario, Batangas
Sto. Rosario Academy, Rosario, Batangas
Scuola San Giuseppe Marello, San Pablo City, Laguna

Order of Augustinian Recollects – Ordo Augustinianorum Recollectorum (OAR)
San Sebastian College – Recoletos de Manila
San Sebastian College – Recoletos de Cavite, Sta. Cruz, Cavite City
Colegio de Santo Tomas – Recoletos, San Carlos City, Negros Occidental
 Colegio San Nicolas de Tolentino–Recoletos (formerly UNO-R High School Talisay Branch) (Talisay City, Negros Occidental)
University of Negros Occidental – Recoletos, Bacolod
University of San Jose – Recoletos, Cebu City

Order of Saint Augustine (Augustinians) – Ordo Fratrum Sancti Augustini (OSA)
Colegio San Agustin – Bacolod
Colegio San Agustin – Makati
Colegio San Agustin – Biñan
  Colegio San Agustin – Bulacan
University of San Agustin, Iloilo City

Order of Friars Minor (Franciscans) – Ordo Fratrum Minorum (O.F.M.)
Our Lady of the Angels Seminary
Our Lady of Montecelli Learning Center
San Jose Parochial School
St. Francis School

Order of Friars Minor Capuchin (Capuchins) – Ordo Fratrum Minorum Capuccinorum (O.F.M. Cap.)
Our Lady of Lourdes Seminary
Lourdes School of Mandaluyong
Lourdes School of Quezon City

Order of Preachers (Dominicans) – Ordo Fratrum Praedicatorum (O.P.)
Aquinas School San Juan – Metro Manila
Angelicum School Iloilo
Colegio de San Juan de Letran, Manila
Colegio de San Juan de Letran – Abucay, Bataan
Colegio de San Juan de Letran – Calamba, Laguna
Colegio de San Juan de Letran – Manaoag, Pangasinan
Dominican College, San Juan
Dominican School, Angeles City, Pampanga
Dominican School, Apalit, Pampanga
Dominican School, Calabanga, Camarines Sur
Dominican School, Cebu
Dominican School, Pilar, Sorsogon
San Pedro College – Davao City
University of Santo Tomas, Manila
University of Santo Tomas - Legazpi, Albay
University of Santo Tomas – Sta. Rosa Laguna
University of Santo Tomas-General Santos City
UST Angelicum College, Quezon City

Order of Saint Benedict (Benedictines) – Ordo Sancti Benedicti (O.S.B.)
San Beda University Manila
San Beda College Alabang

Religious of the Assumption (RA)
Assumption College San Lorenzo
Assumption Antipolo
Assumption Iloilo
  Assumption Passi
San Juan Nepomuceno School
St. Martin School
St. Vincent Academy
Sta. Rita Academy

Religious of the Virgin Mary (RVM)
See
Holy Cross Academy, Digos, Davao del Sur 
St. Mary’s Academy of Manila, Yakal, Manila
St. Mary’s Academy, Sta. Ana, Manila
St. Mary's Academy of Caloocan City Metro Manila
St. Mary's Academy of Pasay, Metro Manila 
St. Mary’s Academy, Hagonoy, Bulacan
St. Mary’s Academy, Sto. Niño, Bulacan
St. Mary’s Academy, Guagua, Pampanga 
St. Mary’s Academy, Nagcarlan, Laguna 
St. Mary’s Academy, Cagayan de Oro City, Misamis Oriental  
St. Mary’s Academy, Talisayan, Misamis Oriental 
St. Mary’s Academy, Jasaan, Misamis Oriental 
St. Mary's Academy of Midsayap, Cotabato
St. Mary’s Academy, Kidapawan, North Cotabato
St. Mary’s Academy, Dipolog City, Zamboanga del Norte 
St. Mary’s Academy, Labason, Zamboanga del Norte 
Saint Mary's Academy of Capiz, Roxas City, Capiz
St. Mary's College of Baliuag, Bulacan
St. Mary’s College, Borongan, Eastern Samar 
St. Mary’s College, Tagum City, Davao del Norte
Saint Mary's College of Quezon City, Quezon City, Metro Manila 
Saint Mary's College of Meycauayan, Meycauayan, Bulacan
St. Mary’s College of Catbalogan, Catbalogan City, Samar
Christ the King College, Gingoog City, Misamis Oriental
Pilar College, Zamboanga City
St. Rita's College, Balingasag, Misamis Oriental 
St. Michael’s College, Iligan City
Lourdes College, Cagayan de Oro City 
Notre Dame – RVM College of Cotabato, Cotabato City 
Notre Dame of Makilala, North Cotabato
Our Lady of Fatima, Davao City
University of the Immaculate Conception, Davao City

Religious Sisters of Mercy (RSM)
 Fatima College of Camiguin, Mambajao, Camiguin

Salesians of the Society of Saint John Bosco (Salesians) – Societas Sancti Francisci Salesii (SDB)
Don Bosco College, Canlubang
Don Bosco Technical College, Mandaluyong Metro Manila
Don Bosco Technical College–Cebu Cebu
Don Bosco Technical Institute, Makati Metro Manila
Don Bosco Technical Institute, Tarlac Tarlac
Don Bosco Technical Institute, Victorias Negros Occidental
Don Bosco Academy, Pampanga Pampanga
Don Bosco High School, Lagawe Ifugao
Don Bosco Formation Center, Talisay

Society of the Divine Word (Divine Word Missionaries) – (Societas Verbi Divini (SVD)
Divine Word Academy of Dagupan – Rizal Ext., Dagupan, Pangasinan
Divine Word College of Bangued – Bangued, Abra
Divine Word College of Calapan – Calapan, Oriental Mindoro
Divine Word College of Laoag – Gen. Segundo Ave., Laoag, Ilocos Norte
Divine Word College of Legazpi – Rizal Street, Legazpi, Albay
Divine Word College of San Jose – San Jose, Occidental Mindoro
Divine Word College of Urdaneta – Urdaneta, Pangasinan
Divine Word College of Vigan – Vigan, Ilocos Sur
Divine Word Mission Seminary – 101 E. Rodriguez Sr. Blvd., Quezon City
Divine Word Mission Seminary – Davao City, Davao del Sur
Divine Word Seminary – Tagaytay, Cavite
Divine Word University (DWU) – Tacloban, Leyte; closed in 1995, re-opened as Liceo del Verbo Divino in 2006
Holy Name University – Tagbilaran, Bohol (formerly Holy Name College; also Divine Word College of Tagbilaran) 
University of San Carlos – Cebu City
Saint Jude Catholic School – San Miguel, Manila

Society of Jesus (Jesuits) – Societas Jesu (SJ)

Ateneo de Manila University, Quezon City, Metro Manila
Ateneo de Zamboanga University, Zamboanga City
Ateneo de Cagayan – Xavier University, Cagayan de Oro City
Ateneo de Naga University, Naga City, Camarines Sur
Ateneo de Davao University, Davao City
Loyola College of Culion, Palawan
Ateneo de Iloilo - Santa Maria Catholic School, Iloilo City, Iloilo
Sacred Heart School - Ateneo de Cebu, Mandaue City, Cebu
Xavier School, San Juan, Metro Manila / Nuvali, Laguna

Prelature of the Holy Cross and Opus Dei – Praelatura Sanctae Crucis et Operis Dei 
University of Asia and the Pacific, Pasig

Archdiocese – Diocese

Archdiocese of Cebu
 Saint Catherine’s College Carcar City, Cebu

Archdiocese of Cotabato
 Notre Dame of Arakan, Cotabato
 Notre Dame of Libungan, Cotabato
 Notre Dame of Magpet, Cotabato
 Notre Dame of Matalam, Cotabato
 Notre Dame of Pigcawayan, Cotabato
 Notre Dame of Parang, Maguindanao
 Notre Dame of Sarmiento, Parang, Maguindanao
 Notre Dame of Upi, Maguindanao
 Notre Dame of Columbio, Sultan Kudarat
 Notre Dame of Dukay, Sultan Kudarat
 Notre Dame of Esperanza, Sultan Kudarat
Notre Dame of Isulan, Sultan Kudarat
Notre Dame of Kalamansig, Sultan Kudarat
 Notre Dame of Katiko, Sultan Kudarat
 Notre Dame of Kulaman, Sultan Kudarat
 Notre Dame of Lambayong, Sultan Kudarat
 Notre Dame of Masiag, Sultan Kudarat
 Notre Dame Of Milbuk, Palimbang, Sultan Kudarat
Notre Dame of Salaman College, Lebak, Sultan Kudarat 
Notre Dame of Tacurong College, Sultan Kudarat

Archdiocese of Davao
San Lorenzo College of Davao, Davao City
Holy Cross of Davao College,

Archdiocese of San Fernando, Pampanga
University of the Assumption, San Fernando Pampanga

Diocese of Butuan 
Father Saturnino Urios University, Butuan

Diocese of Dipolog
 Saint Vincent's College Incorporated – Dipolog City, Zamboanga del Norte
 St. Joseph College Incorporated – Sindangan, Zamboanga del Norte
 Rizal Memorial Institute of Dapitan City Incorporated – Dapitan City, Zamboanga del Norte

Diocese of Iba
Columban College, Olongapo City

Diocese of Ilagan
Saint Ferdinand College, Ilagan

Diocese of Imus
 Saint Therese Catholic School – Noveleta, Cavite
 Saint Mary Magdalene School – Kawit, Cavite
 Saint Gregory Academy – Indang, Cavite
 Saint Augustine School – Mendez, Cavite
 Saint Augustine School – Tanza, Cavite
 Saint Francis of Assisi Academy – Tagaytay City
 Saint John Nepomucene Catholic School – Alfonso, Cavite
 Saint Joseph Parochial School of Cavite – Alfonso, Cavite
 St. Jude Parish School – Trece Martires City, Cavite
 St. Mary Magdalene Parochial School – Amadeo, Cavite 
 St. Michael’s Institute – Bacoor City, Cavite,
 Santo Rosario Catholic School – Rosario, Cavite
 San Francisco de Malabon Parochial School – Gen. Trias City, Cavite
 Holy Family Academy of GMA – GMA, Cavite
 De Guia Academy of Magallanes – Magallanes, Cavite
 Maragondon Parochial School – Maragondon, Cavite
 Fr. Michael Donoher Memorial School – Silang, Cavite
 Nazareth School of General Aguinaldo Cavite – Gen. E. Aguinaldo, Cavite
 Jesus, Son of Mary Academy – Dasmariñas, Cavite
 Sacred Heart of Jesus Academy of Dasmariñas Cavite, – Dasmarinas, Cavite
 Our Lady of the Pillar Catholic School – Imus City, Cavite
 Mabuting Pastol Parochial School – Dasmariñas, Cavite
 Infant Jesus Academy of Silang – Silang, Cavite
 Paraclete Foundation Community School – Silang, Cavite
 Holy Cross Catholic School of Noveleta – Noveleta, Cavite
 Padre Pio Child Development Center – GMA Cavite
 Lorenzo School of the Diocese of Chuncheon – Trece Martires City, Cavite
 Academia de San Vicente Ferrer – Indang, Cavite

Diocese of Marbel
 Notre Dame Of Glan, Sarangani
 Notre Dame Of Kiamba, Sarangani
 Notre Dame Of Maasim, Sarangani
 Notre Dame Of Maitum Sarangani 
 Notre Dame Of New Iloilo, Tantangan, South Cotabato
 Notre Dame Of Norala, South Cotabato
 Notre Dame Of San Jose, Koronadal, South Cotabato
 Notre Dame Of Sto. Niño, South Cotabato
 Notre Dame Cathedral Elementary School, Cotabato City, South Cotabato

Independent
Angeles University Foundation, Angeles
Holy Angel University, Angeles
University of Saint Anthony, Iriga

References

Philippines
Catholic